"Kike" is a pejorative term for Jews.

Kike may also refer to:

People

Nickname
Pronounced "kee-kay", it is a common diminutive of the given name Enrique. Notable people named Enrique and nicknamed Kike include:

Football (soccer)
Kike Barja (born 1997), Spanish football winger, full name Enrique Barja Afonso
Kike Boula (born 1993), Equatoguinean football forward, full name Enrique Boula Senobua
Kike Burgos (born 1971), Spanish retired football goalkeeper, full name Enrique Burgos Carrasco
Kike Carrasco (born 1998), Spanish football back and winger, full name Luis Enrique Carrasco Acosta
Kike Echávarri (born 1994), Spanish football central defender, full name Enrique Javier Montesinos Echávarri
Kike García (Spanish footballer) (born 1989), Spanish football striker, full name Enrique García Martínez
Kike García (Venezuelan footballer) (born 1982), Venezuelan football midfielder, full name Enrique García Feijoó
Kike Hermoso (born 1999), Spanish football central defender, full name Enrique Gómez Hermoso
Kike López (born 1988), Spanish football right winger or right back, full name Enrique López Delgado
Kike Márquez (born 1989), Spanish football left winger, full name Enrique Márquez Climent
Kike Mateo (born 1979), Spanish football manager and retired midfielder, full name Enrique Mateo Montoya
Kike Pérez (born 1997), Spanish football midfielder, full name Enrique Pérez Muñoz
Kike Rodríguez (born 1991), Peruvian football central defender, full name Enrique Rodríguez Castillo
Kike Saverio (born 1999), Italian-born football winger in Spain, full name Javier Enrique Delgado Saverio
Kike Sola (born 1986), Spanish retired football striker, full name Enrique Sola Clemente
Kike Tortosa (footballer, born 1983), Spanish football right back, full name Enrique Tortosa García
Kike Tortosa (footballer, born 1991), Spanish football forward, full name Enrique Tortosa Palma

Other sports
Kike (futsal player, born 1978), Spanish futsal player, full name Enrique Boned Guillot
Kike Hernández (born 1991), Puerto Rican professional baseball player, full name Enrique Javier Hernández
Ritva 'Kike' Elomaa (born 1955), Finnish female bodybuilder, singer, and politician, nicknamed "Kike"

Outside of sport
Kike Casanova (born 1980), Paraguayan TV presenter, announcer and lawyer
Kike Maíllo (born 1975), Spanish film director and screenwriter
Kike Oniwinde (born 1992), British entrepreneur and former javelin thrower
Kike Santander (born 1960), Colombian songwriter and producer

Other
Notable people with similar variants of the nickname include:
David Bernier (born 1977), Puerto Rican politician nicknamed "Quique"
Kiki Camarena (1947 – 1985), former DEA agent murdered in Mexico by members of the Guadalajara Cartel
Kayke Rodrigues (born 1998), Brazilian professional footballer
Quique (footballer, born 1945), retired Spanish football defender

See also
 Ikey (disambiguation)
 Čaić, a village in the municipality of Livno, Bosnia and Herzegovina
 Kaike language, a Sino-Tibetan language of Nepal
 KEYK, former call sign of radio station KKRT in Wenatchee, Washington, United States
 Quique (disambiguation)